Galtzaraborda is a railway station in Errenteria, Basque Country, Spain. It is owned by Euskal Trenbide Sarea and operated by Euskotren. It lies on the San Sebastián-Hendaye railway, popularly known as the Topo line.

History 
The station wasn't part of the line when it opened in 1912.

As part of the new alignment of the line between Herrera and Galtzaraborda, the station will be put underground. Works started in early 2022 and their completion is scheduled for 2027.

Services 
The station is served by Euskotren Trena line E2. It runs every 15 minutes during weekdays and weekend afternoons, and every 30 minutes on weekend mornings.

References

External links
 

Euskotren Trena stations
Railway stations in Gipuzkoa
Railway stations in Spain opened in 1992
1992 establishments in the Basque Country (autonomous community)